Kurukulasuriya Maureen O'Hara Perera (born 19 September, 1963 as මොරින් චාරුනී) [Sinhala]), popularly known as Maureen Charuni, is an actress in Sri Lankan cinema theater and television. Highly versatile actress who dominated television drama, Charuni usually acts in young motherly roles in many dramas and films.

Acting career
Her maiden cinematic experience came through film Karadiya Walalla, directed by Cyril Wickramage. But the film Ranmalige Wasanawa screened before the Karadiya Walalla. She directed the film Hansa Vilapaya in 2000.

Selected television serials

 Aaliya
 Abarthu Atha
 Amaa
 Anagana
 Ananthaya 
 Ann
 Anuhas Vijithaya
 Anuththara
 Aravinda saha Indu as Indu
 Ayomi as Mangalika
 Batahira Ahasa
 Bodhi
 Dangakara Tharu
 Daruwange Ammala
 Dedunnai Adare
 Dedunu Sihina
 Dedunu Yanaya
 Depath Nai
 Deveni Amma
 Gamperaliya as Nanda
 Gimhana Tharanaya 
 Guwan Palama
 Haara Kotiya
 Heeye Manaya 
 Himi Nethi Hadakata
 Hirusanda Maima 
 Irudeniyaya
 Isuru Sangramaya
 Jayathuru Sankaya
 Kalu Sewanella
 Koombiyo
 Kulawanthayo
 Lasa Rala
 Mila
 Millewa Walawwa
 Minigandela
 Nandunana Neyo
 Nethu Addara
 Oba Mageya
 Paara
 Panamankada
 Poddi
 Pembara Maw Sanda
 Ran Bedi Minissu
 Ran Kira Soya
 Ran Samanalayo
 Ran Sevanali
 Salmal Landa
 Samanalayano
 Samanala Sihinaya 
 Samanala Yaya 
 Sanda Diya Mankada
 Sandagalathenna  as Dingiri Menika
 Sandagiri Pawwa
 Sanda Hiru Tharu
 Sapirivara
 Sara
 Saranganaa
 Saveena
 Senehase Nimnaya 
 Sihina Samagama 
 Sihina Siththaravi
 Sihina Sithuvam
 Sil
 Siri Sirimal 
 Siyapayth Arama
 Snehaye Daasi
 Sudu Paraviyo as Iresha
 Sulanga
 Suwanda Obai Amme
 Teacher Amma 
 Thuththiri
 Vihanga Geethaya
 Wasantha Kusalana
 Yugandaraya

Selected stage dramas
 Dangamalla

Filmography

References

External links
 Marin Charuni chat
 පුණ්‍ය කටයුත්තට පෝන් නම්බර්....
 අපේ ගෙදර නෑදෑයාෙ පිරෙනවා
 මටත් දුවක් ඕනෑ වුණා...
 මේ හැරවුමක අැරඹුමක්

Living people
Sri Lankan film actresses
1963 births
20th-century Sri Lankan actresses
21st-century Sri Lankan actresses
Sri Lankan television actresses
Sri Lankan stage actresses
People from Puttalam District